The Quebec Open  is a Canadian darts tournament that has been held since 2006 the event comprises both men's singles and doubles and women's singles and doubles competition.

List of winners

Men's

Women's

Tournament records
 Most wins 2:  Dawson Murschell. 
 Most Finals 4:  Marcel Simard.
 Most Semi Finals 7:  Marcel Simard.
 Most Quarter Finals 7:  Marcel Simard. 
 Most Appearances 8:   Marco Gonthier,  Marcel Simard,  Martin Tremblay.
 Most Prize Money won C$3,418:  Marcel Simard.
 Best winning average : .
 Youngest Winner age 19:  Dawson Murschell . 
 Oldest Winner age 52:  Gerry Convery.

References

External links
http://www.dartswdf.com/2016/01/23/quebec-open-2016-canada-results/
NDFC - National Darts Federation of Canada
Québec Darts Association 			 		 	 	

1978 establishments in Quebec
Darts tournaments